João Filipe Poceiro Lopes (born 9 November 1991) is a Swiss footballer of Portuguese descent who plays for Lancy FC.

References

External links
Joao Filipe Poceiro profile at servettefc.ch

1991 births
Footballers from Geneva
Swiss people of Portuguese descent
Living people
Swiss men's footballers
Association football defenders
Servette FC players
Étoile Carouge FC players
FC Stade Nyonnais players
Swiss Super League players
Swiss Challenge League players
Swiss Promotion League players
Swiss 1. Liga (football) players
2. Liga Interregional players